Gracilepteryx is an extinct genus of moths within the family Eolepidopterigidae, containing one species, Gracilepteryx pulchra, which is known from the Late Aptian Crato Formation of the Araripe Basin in northeastern Brazil.

References 

Eolepidopterigoidea
Fossil Lepidoptera
Cretaceous insects
Aptian life
Early Cretaceous animals of South America
Cretaceous Brazil
Fossils of Brazil
Crato Formation
Fossil taxa described in 1989